Tutufa (Tutufella) nigrita, common name the blackened frog shell, is a species of sea snail, a marine gastropod mollusc in the family Bursidae, the frog shells.

Description
The length of the shell varies between 55 mm and 85 mm.

Distribution
This marine species occurs off Madagascar and Mozambique.

References

External links
 

Bursidae
Gastropods described in 1979